Manuel Achille Baudouin (1846 – 24 January 1917) was a French judge.

Baudouin was appointed as an Advocate-General at Lyons in 1880, Procurator-General at Limoges in 1885, Advocate-General of the Court of Cassation in 1890, Paris.

In 1893 he was appointed President of the Civil Tribunal in this court, and was Procurator-General during the 1899 reopening of the Dreyfus case. In 1911, he was appointed Chief President of the Court of Cassation, a post he held until his death.

References
Obituary: p. 156, The Annual Register: a review of public events at home and abroad, for the year 1917. London: Longmans, Green and Co. 1918.

1846 births
1917 deaths
Court of Cassation (France) judges
19th-century French judges
20th-century French judges
19th-century French lawyers